Zorka Grandov (6 March 1947 – 18 September 2021) was a Serbian doctor of economics, professor emeritus and writer.

Education 
She graduated in economics from the University of Belgrade Faculty of Economics in 1969 and went on to get a magister degree. She finished her PhD studies in 1987 at the Faculty of Economics in Subotica, which belongs to the University of Novi Sad.

Career 
Grandov started her career in economy in 1970. She started working for the Serbian Chamber of Commerce and in the Ministry of economy in Socialist Federal Republic of Yugoslavia in 1986.

She soon started her teaching career, teaching at universities in Serbia, Bosnia and Herzegovina and Spain. While working as a professor, she has mentored a couple of dozen masters, magisters and doctors theses and has been a member of the Scientific Society of Economists of Serbia since 2002.

Grandov has participated in and organised many research programs. While working as a professor, she had participated in many exchange programs and took part in many conferences abroad. She went to Santiago and Seoul in 1997 and Singapore in 2001.

She became the editor-in-chief of the economy magazine EMC Review in 2011 and still held that position. She was also the president of the program board of the international scientific conference Economic development and Standard of living EDASOL, which takes place every year in Banja Luka.

She was the president of the program board at the scientific conference Power of Communication POWERCOMM, which was held in Belgrade in 2012.

Zorka worked as the manager in accreditation of many universities and study programs, including Union University.

Writing 
Zorka Grandov has published over a hundred important articles in the fields of international and business economics in national and international scientific papers. She also wrote a number of books in economic globalization, international business and trade.

Grandov also published an autobiography, A traveler without a path (Serbian: Пешак у беспућу; Pešak u bespuću).

Books 
 Grandov, Z.: Jugoslovenska trgovina u tržišnoj privredi, IPC-JU, Beograd, 1990.
 Grandov, Z.: Spoljnotrgovinsko poslovanje, prvo izdanje, Trgovačko društvo BTO, Beograd, 1997. ID 58244364
 Grandov, Z.: Trgovinsko poslovanje, Trgovačko društvo BTO, Beograd, 2000., ID 88487948
 Grandov, Z.: Pregovaranje u međunarodnom biznisu, Trgovačko društvo BTO, Beograd. 
 Grandov, Z.: Spoljnotrgovinsko poslovanje u globalnom okruženju, Trgovačko društvo BTO, Beograd.
 Grandov, Z.: Međunarodni biznis i trgovina, Trgovačko društvo BTO, Beograd. 
 Grandov, Z.: Međunarodna ekonomija i globalizacija, Trgovačko društvo BTO, Beograd. 
 Grandov, Z. Đokić, M.: Strategije planiranja i budžetiranje, Trgovačko društvo BTO, Beograd, (Naučna knjiga). 
 Grandov, Z. Đokić, M., Laketa, M: Planiranje i budžetiranje, Trgovačko društvo BTO, Beograd, (Naučna knjiga). 
 Grandov, Z. Đokić, M.: Trgovinski marketing menadžment, Trgovačko društvo BTO, Beograd, (Naučna knjiga). 
 Grandov Z., Đokić M.: Trgovinski marketing menadžment, Panevropski univerzitet Apeiron, Banja Luka. 
 Grandov Z., Đokić M.: Međunarodni biznis i trgovina, Panevropski univerzitet Apeiron, Banja Luka.

Articles 
 Grandov, Z., Vidas-Bubanja, M.: Ekonomski odnosi u regionu, u svetlu povećanja izvoza, Ekonomski anali, tematski broj/10/2002., Beograd
 Grandov, Z., Vidas-Bubanja, M.: Tranzicija tržišnih institucija – dve godine posle, Ekonomski anali, tematski broj/01/2003., Beograd
 Grandov, Z.: Carinski sistem i stope kao podsticaj spoljnotrgovinskoj razmeni, Ekonomski anali, tematski broj/09/2003., Beograd
 Grandov, Z.: Spoljnotrgovinski deficit i process stabilizacije i pridruživanja SCG Evropskoj Uniji, Ekonomski anali, tematski broj/09/2004., Beograd
 Grandov, Z.: Trgovinska politika i process stabilizacije i pridruživanja EU, Ekonomski anali, tematski broj/04/2005., Beograd
 Grandov, Z.: Ekonomska kretanja u Beogradu indikacija za Srbiju, Ekonomski anali, tematski broj/12/2003., Beograd
 Grandov, Z., Đokić, M.:Značaj investicionog okruženja za plasman sranih direktnih investicija", Pravo-teorija i praksa, 7-8/ 2010, Novi Sad. . str. 23–38 UDK 339.727.22(4) BIBLID:0352-3713(2010);26;(7-8): 23–37
 Grandov, Z., Đokić, M.: Oglašavanje i zaštita potrošača, Pravo-teorija i praksa, 11-12/ 2009, Novi Sad. . str. 67- 79, UDK 336.5 BIBLID:0352-3713(2009);26;(11-12):67-79
 Grandov, Z., Ogrizović, Ž., Đokić, M.: Small and medium enterprises management, Zbornik radova, FIMEK, 2. str. 36–41., UDK 65.017.2/.32
 Grandov Z., Jovanović R.: Zaštita potrošača – komparativna analiza srbije i susednih zemalja, Časopis za ekonomiju i tržišne komunikacije EMC Review, Banja Luka, 2011. UDK:33, . str. 9–27
 Grandov Z., Stankov B., Đokić M.: Primena statističke metode linearanog trenda na izračunavanje vrednosti ulaznih tokova SDI u Srbiji i Hrvatskoj, Časopis za ekonomiju i tržišne komunikacije EMC Review, Godina III, broj II, (2013). str. 164–178
 Grandov Z., Stankov, B., Roganović M.: Uporedna analiza faktora koji podstiču inostrane investitore na direktna ulaganja u Srbiji i Rumuniji, Visoka poslovna škola Novi Sad, Škola biznisa, naučno-stručni časopis, 2014. . str. 141–169
 Grandov Z., Stankov B., Đokić M.: Istraživanje zadovoljstva potrošača uslugama Delhaize grupe u Srbiji, EMC Review, Godina V, broj II, 2015. . str. 168–193

Sources 
 Zorka Grandov. A traveler without a path. 2016. .

External links 
 A traveler without a path Blog
 EMC Review

1947 births
2021 deaths
Serbian economists
Serbian women writers
Serbian writers
Serbs of Bosnia and Herzegovina
University of Belgrade Faculty of Economics alumni
University of Novi Sad alumni
People from Una-Sana Canton